Graal-Müritz is a Seeheilbad (seaside health resort) in the German state of Mecklenburg-Vorpommern. It is located in the Rostock district, near Rostock, Ribnitz-Damgarten and Stralsund.

Graal-Müritz is among the most popular German destinations for tourism and health cures alike. It borders both the Baltic Sea and a large forest called Rostock Heath. The town offers many hotels, restaurants, a  beach, a public Rhododendron Park and a well-being and fitness centre. There is an hourly train service to Rostock. This journey takes 30 minutes.

Museums
Graal-Müritz has its own museum of local history called "Heimatstube". In the region, there are several large museums like the Shipbuilding and Seafaring Museum (Schiffbau- und Schifffahrtsmuseum) in Rostock, the German Amber Museum (Deutsches Bernsteinmuseum) in Ribnitz-Damgarten or the German Maritime Museum in Stralsund.

Sports and recreation
The local sports club, TSV Graal-Müritz, plays in the state's league. The Aquadrom is a large well-being, swimming and fitness facility.

Gallery

References

External links
 

Seaside resorts in Germany
Populated coastal places in Germany (Baltic Sea)